Pennsylvania Route 436 (PA 436) is a  state highway located in Jefferson county in Pennsylvania. The southern terminus is at U.S. Route 119 (US 119) near Punxsutawney. The northern terminus is at PA 36 in Punxsutawney. PA 436 was assigned in the 1928 numbering of roads in Pennsylvania and not paved until 1932. The road's other lone major intersection on PA 436 is for State Route 3010 (SR 3010).

Route description 

PA 436 begins at an intersection with US 119 in Punxsutawney. A park and ride lot is located at the southwest corner of the intersection. The route goes northward, parallelling US 119 for most of its length. The highway intersects with SR 3010 (Sportsburg Road), which heads westward and ends in the small village of Sportsburg. PA 436 continues northward, intersecting with local roads and beginning to go down in elevation. There it enters downtown Punxsutawney and terminates at an intersection with PA 36 (West Main Street).

History
PA 436 was signed along its current routing in 1928, like most routes in Pennsylvania. The route then was not paved and this did not occur for another four years, when the road was paved in 1932.

Major intersections

See also

References

External links 

Pennsylvania Highways: PA 436

436